Fial (also Romanized as Fīāl, Fiyāl, and Feyāl; also known as Sheykh Mīrī Sādāt) is a village in Hemmatabad Rural District, in the Central District of Borujerd County, Lorestan Province, Iran. At the 2006 census, its population was 2,460, in 607 families.

References 

Towns and villages in Borujerd County